Lech Poznań is a Polish football club based in Poznań. This was their 99th season overall. They competed in Ekstraklasa, the highest ranking league in Poland.

Due to COVID-19 pandemic in Poland the number of spectators was limited and controlled by the Polish government. Starting from 26 June 2021, the number of spectators of Ekstraklasa and Polish Cup competitions could reach at maximum 50% of stadium capacity.

Club

Coaching staff

Total income:  €2,500,000

Total expenditure:  €1,200,000

Winter transfer window

In

|}

Total spending:  €1,100,000

Out

|}

Total income:  €0

Total expenditure:  €1,100,000

Friendlies

Competitions

Overview

Ekstraklasa

League table

Results summary

Results by round

Matches

Polish Cup

Statistics

Appearances and goals

|-
! colspan=9 style="background:#000099; color:white"; text-align:center| Goalkeepers
|-

|-
! colspan=9 style="background:#000099; color:white"; text-align:center| Defenders
|-

|-
! colspan=9 style="background:#000099; color:white"; text-align:center| Midfielders
|-

|-
! colspan=9 style="background:#000099; color:white"; text-align:center| Forwards
|-

|-
!colspan="9" style="background:#000099; color:white"; text-align:center|Players who appeared for Lech and left the club during the season:
|-

|-
|}

Goalscorers

Assists

Clean sheets

Disciplinary record

Home attendances

References

Lech Poznan
Lech Poznań seasons